Andrea Veggio (28 August 1923 – 6 June 2020) was an Italian Prelate of Catholic Church.

Biography 
He was born in Manerba del Garda, Italy and was ordained a priest on 29 June 1947. He was appointed auxiliary bishop to the Diocese of Verona on 1 August 1983, as well as titular bishop of Velia, and ordained bishop on 8 September 1983. He retired from the diocese of Verona on 8 September 2001. He died in the “Casa del Clero” of Negrar, Italy on 6 June 2020.

External links
 Catholic-Hierarchy
 Diocese of Verona (Italian)

1923 births
2020 deaths
20th-century Italian titular bishops
Bishops in Veneto
Religious leaders from the Province of Brescia